Harttia merevari is a species of armored catfish of the family endemic to Venezuela where it is found in the upper Caura River.

Characteristics 
Harttia merevari is distinguished from similar species by the presence of a naked abdomen, two or three preanal plates, a bony plate before each branchial opening, seven lateral plates between the pectoral and pelvic finsm a short maxillary barbel attached to the oral disk by a fleshy fold. The head, dorsal surface and anterior portion of the species' body are light or dark yellow with numerous, round black spots, while the posterior region of the body is light or dark yellow with five black transverse bands, with the dorsal central area of the two anterior bands diffused.

References 
 

merevari
Endemic fauna of Venezuela
Fish of Venezuela
Taxa named by Francisco Provenzano-Rizzi
Taxa named by Antonio Machado-Allison
Taxa named by Barry Chernoff
Taxa named by Philip W. Willink
Taxa named by Paulo Petry
Fish described in 2005
Catfish of South America